Christian atheism is a form of Christianity that rejects the theistic claims of Christianity, but draws its beliefs and practices from Jesus' life and teachings as recorded in the New Testament Gospels and other sources.

Christian atheism takes many forms:
 Some include an ethics system.
 Some are types of cultural Christianity.
 Some Christian atheists take a theological position in which the theistic belief in the transcendent or interventionist God is rejected or absent in favor of finding God totally in the world (Thomas J. J. Altizer).
 Others follow Jesus in a godless world (William Hamilton).
 Hamilton's Christian atheism is similar to Jesuism.

Beliefs 

Thomas Ogletree, Frederick Marquand Professor of Ethics and Religious Studies at Yale Divinity School, lists these four common beliefs:
 The assertion of the unreality of God for our age, including the understandings of God which have been a part of traditional Christian theology.
 The insistence upon coming to grips with contemporary culture as a necessary feature of responsible theological work.
 Varying degrees and forms of alienation from the church as it is now constituted.
 Recognition of the centrality of the person of Jesus in theological reflection.

God's existence 
According to Paul van Buren, a Death of God theologian, the word God itself is "either meaningless or misleading". Van Buren contends that it is impossible to think about God and says:  We cannot identify anything which will count for or against the truth of our statements concerning 'God'. The inference from these claims to the "either meaningless or misleading" conclusion is implicitly premised on the verificationist theory of meaning.

Most Christian atheists believe that God never existed, but there are a few who believe in the death of God literally. Thomas J. J. Altizer is a well-known Christian atheist who is known for his literal approach to the death of God. He often speaks of God's death as a redemptive event. In his book The Gospel of Christian Atheism, he says: Every man today who is open to experience knows that God is absent, but only the Christian knows that God is dead, that the death of God is a final and irrevocable event and that God's death has actualized in our history a new and liberated humanity.

Dealing with culture 
Theologians including Altizer and Colin Lyas, a philosophy lecturer at Lancaster University, looked at the scientific, empirical culture of today and tried to find religion's place in it. In Altizer's words:
 He goes on to say that our response to atheism should be one of "acceptance and affirmation".

Colin Lyas stated:

Separation from the church 
Thomas Altizer has said: [T]he radical Christian believes that the ecclesiastical tradition has ceased to be Christian. 

Altizer believed that orthodox Christianity no longer had any meaning to people because it did not discuss Christianity within the context of contemporary theology. Christian atheists want to be completely separated from most orthodox Christian beliefs and biblical traditions. Altizer states that a faith will not be completely pure if it not is open to modern culture. This faith "can never identify itself with an ecclesiastical tradition or with a given doctrinal or ritual form". He goes on to say that faith cannot "have any final assurance as to what it means to be a Christian". Altizer said: "We must not, he says, seek for the sacred by saying 'no' to the radical profanity of our age, but by saying 'yes' to it". They see religions which withdraw from the world as moving away from truth. This is part of the reason why they see the existence of God as counter-progressive. Altizer wrote of God as the enemy to man because mankind could never reach its fullest potential while God existed. He went on to state that "to cling to the Christian God in our time is to evade the human situation of our century and to renounce the inevitable suffering which is its lot".

Centrality of Jesus 

Although Jesus is still a central feature of Christian atheism, Hamilton said that to the Christian atheist, Jesus as a historical or supernatural figure is not the foundation of faith; instead, Jesus is a "place to be, a standpoint". Christian atheists look to Jesus as an example of what a Christian should be, but they do not see him as God, nor as the Son of God; merely as an influential rabbi.

Hamilton wrote that following Jesus means being "alongside the neighbor, being for him" and that to follow Jesus means to be human, to help other humans, and to further humankind.

Other Christian atheists such as Thomas Altizer preserve the divinity of Jesus, arguing that through him God negates God's transcendence of being.

By denomination
Out of all Americans who do not believe in God, 5% identified as Catholic while 9% identified as Protestant and other Christian according to the 2007 Pew Religious Landscape survey. Out of all Americans who identify as unaffiliated including atheists and agnostics, 41% were raised Protestant and 28% were raised Catholic according to the 2014 Pew Religious Landscape survey.

Protestantism
In the Netherlands, 42% of the members of the Protestant Church in the Netherlands (PKN) are nontheists. Non-belief among clergymen is not always perceived as a problem. Some follow the tradition of "Christian non-realism", most famously expounded in the United Kingdom by Don Cupitt in the 1980s, which holds that God is a symbol or metaphor and that religious language is not matched by a transcendent reality. According to an investigation of 860 pastors in seven Dutch Protestant denominations, 1 in 6 clergy are either agnostic or atheist. In one of those denominations, the Remonstrant Brotherhood, the number of doubters was 42 percent. A minister of the PKN, Klaas Hendrikse has described God as "a word for experience, or human experience" and said that Jesus may have never existed. Hendrikse gained attention with his book published in November 2007 in which he said that it was not necessary to believe in God's existence in order to believe in God. The Dutch title of the book translates as Believing in a God Who Does Not Exist: Manifesto of An Atheist Pastor. Hendrikse writes in the book that "God is for me not a being but a word for what can happen between people. Someone says to you, for example, 'I will not abandon you', and then makes those words come true. It would be perfectly alright to call that [relationship] God". A General Synod found Hendrikse's views were widely shared among both clergy and church members. The February 3, 2010 decision to allow Hendrikse to continue working as a pastor followed the advice of a regional supervisory panel that the statements by Hendrikse "are not of sufficient weight to damage the foundations of the Church. The ideas of Hendrikse are theologically not new, and are in keeping with the liberal tradition that is an integral part of our church", the special panel concluded.

A Harris Interactive survey from 2003 found that 90% of self-identified Protestants in the United States believe in God and about 4% of American Protestants believe there is no God. In 2017, the WIN-Gallup International Association (WIN/GIA) poll found that Sweden, a majority Christian country, had second highest percentage (76%) of those who claim themselves atheist or irreligious, after China.

A substantial portion of Quakers are nontheist Quakers. Among British Quakers, 14.5% identified as atheists and 43% felt "unable to profess belief in God" in 2013.

Catholicism
Catholic atheism is a belief in which the culture, traditions, rituals and norms of Catholicism are accepted, but the existence of God is rejected. It is illustrated in Miguel de Unamuno's novel San Manuel Bueno, Mártir (1930). According to research in 2007, only 27% of Catholics in the Netherlands considered themselves theist while 55% were ietsist or agnostic deist and 17% were agnostic or atheist. Many Dutch people still affiliate with the term "Catholic" and use it within certain traditions as a basis of their cultural identity, rather than as a religious identity. The vast majority of the Catholic population in the Netherlands is now largely irreligious in practice.

Criticisms 
In his book Mere Christianity, the apologist C. S. Lewis objected to Hamilton's version of Christian atheism and the claim that Jesus was merely a moral guide:
I am trying here to prevent anyone saying the really foolish thing that people often say about Him: 'I'm ready to accept Jesus as a great moral teacher, but I don't accept his claim to be God.' That is the one thing we must not say. A man who was merely a man and said the sort of things Jesus said would not be a great moral teacher. He would either be a lunatic—on the level with the man who says he is a poached egg—or else he would be the Devil of Hell. You must make your choice. Either this man was, and is, the Son of God, or else a madman or something worse. You can shut him up for a fool, you can spit at him and kill him as a demon or you can fall at his feet and call him Lord and God, but let us not come with any patronising nonsense about his being a great human teacher. He has not left that open to us. He did not intend to. ... Now it seems to me obvious that He was neither a lunatic nor a fiend: and consequently, however strange or terrifying or unlikely it may seem, I have to accept the view that He was and is God.

Lewis's argument, now known as Lewis's trilemma, has been criticized for, among other things, constituting a false trilemma, since it does not deal with other options such as Jesus being mistaken, misrepresented, or simply mythical. Philosopher John Beversluis argues that Lewis "deprives his readers of numerous alternate interpretations of Jesus that carry with them no such odious implications". Bart Ehrman stated it is a mere legend that the historical Jesus has called himself God; that was unknown to Lewis since he never was a professional Bible scholar.

Theologians and philosophers
 William Montgomery Brown (1855–1937): American Episcopal bishop, communist author and atheist activist. He described himself as a "Christian Atheist".
 John Dominic Crossan (b. 1934): Crossan identifies as a cultural Christian while he has also affirmed he does not believe in a literal God.
 Thorkild Grosbøll (1948–2020): Danish Lutheran priest, publicly announced in 2003 that he did not believe in a higher power, in particular a creating or upholding God. Would continue to function as a priest until 2008 when he retired early.
 George Santayana (1863–1952): Spanish-American philosopher, writer, and novelist. Although a life-long atheist he held Spanish Catholic culture in deep regard. He would describe himself as an "aesthetic Catholic".
 Frank Schaeffer, son of theologian Francis Schaeffer describes himself as "an atheist who believes in God".

Other notable people
 Alexander Lukashenko (b. 1954): President of Belarus. Describes himself as an Orthodox atheist.
 Luboš Motl (b. 1973): Czech theoretical physicist.
 Douglas Murray (b. 1979): British author, journalist and political commentator. He is a former Anglican who believes Christianity to be an important influence on British and European culture.
 Anton Rubinstein (1829–1894): Russian pianist, composer and conductor. Although he was raised as a Christian, Rubinstein later became a Christian atheist.
 Dan Savage (b. 1964): American author, media pundit, journalist and activist for the LGBT community. While he has stated that he is now an atheist, he has said that he still identifies as "culturally Catholic".
 Richard B. Spencer (b. 1978): American Alt-right and white nationalist personality, says that he is an atheist, but described himself as a "cultural Christian".
 Andrew Tompkins, lead singer and bassist of the Australian Christian-themed doom metal band Paramaecium. Tompkins responded to questions of his faith by stating "...As to whether I'm a practicing Christian, I usually tell people I'm a practicing Christian but not a believing Christian."
 Gretta Vosper (b. 1958): United Church of Canada minister who is an atheist.
 Bogusław Wolniewicz (1927–2017): Polish right-wing philosopher, called himself as a "Roman Catholic nonbeliever".
 Slavoj Žižek (b. 1949): Slovenian philosopher who self-identifies as a Christian atheist in the opening line of his book, “Pandemic: COVID-19 Shakes the World.”
Richard Dawkins (b. 1941): A prominent New Atheist who said, "“I would describe myself as a secular Christian in the same sense as secular Jews have a feeling for nostalgia and ceremonies.”

See also 

 Asimov's Guide to the Bible by Isaac Asimov
Atheism in Christianity by Ernst Bloch
 Christian agnosticism
 Christ myth theory
 Demythologization
 Lloyd Geering
 God-Building
 God Is Not Great by Christopher Hitchens
 Jefferson Bible
 Jewish atheism
 Materialism and Christianity
 Nontheist Friends
 Nontheistic religion
 Postchristianity
 Robert Jensen
 Robert M. Price
 Sea of Faith
 Spiritual but not religious
 Spiritualism
 The God Delusion by Richard Dawkins

References

Further reading 
 
 
 Hamilton, William, A Quest for the Post-Historical Jesus, (London, New York: Continuum International Publishing Group, 1994). .

External links 

 Atheists for Jesus 

Religious atheism
Christian secularism
Atheism
Christianity and other religions
Atheism
Death of God theology
Christian radicalism
Catholic culture